The FFA 2000, FFT Eurotrainer 2000, Eurotrainer 2000  is a low wing two seat training aircraft developed by Gyroflug. A prototype was tested and displayed throughout Europe, but the project was canceled.

Development
The Eurotrainer 2000 was developed as a modern low cost trainer for military and civilian pilots developed from AS-202 metal design. The first launch customer was to be Swissair. FFT went out of business in 1992 with one prototype produced.

Design
The aircraft is a four-seat, retractable tricycle gear design. The fuselage and wings are all composite construction. The landing gear uses a trailing link layout.

Operational history
The prototype has been displayed in Paris, France in 1991 at Le Bourget airfield.

Variants
FFA 2000 
FFA Flugzeugwerke project developed in 1985 with a Porsche PFM 3200-T03 engine. Production delays of Porsche engine prompted switch to Lycoming AEIO-540-X100 engine in 1989.
FFT 2000
Gesellschaft für Flugzeug- und Faserverbund-Technologie mbH version (no differences)
Eurotrainer 2000A 
Renamed product

Specifications (FFT Eurotrainer 2000)

Notes

References

1990s international civil utility aircraft
Gyroflug aircraft
Low-wing aircraft
Single-engined tractor aircraft